Diptilon philocles is a moth of the subfamily Arctiinae. It was described by Herbert Druce in 1896. It is found in Panama and São Paulo, Brazil.

References

Euchromiina
Moths described in 1896